William Gifford Palgrave (24 January 1826 – 30 September 1888) was an English priest, soldier, traveller, and Arabist.

Early life and education
Palgrave was born in Westminster. He was the son of Sir Francis Palgrave (born Jewish, converted to Anglican) and Elizabeth Turner, daughter of the banker Dawson Turner. His brothers were Francis Turner Palgrave, Inglis Palgrave and Reginald Palgrave. He was educated at Charterhouse School, then occupying its original site near Smithfield, and under the head-mastership of Dr. Saunders, afterwards Dean of Peterborough. Among other honours he won the school gold medal for classical verse, and proceeded to Trinity College, Oxford, where he obtained a scholarship, graduating First Class Lit. Hum., Second Class Math., 1846.

Early overseas travel and conversion to Catholicism
He went straight from college to India, and served for a time in the 8th Bombay Native Infantry, H.I.C. Shortly after this he became a Roman Catholic, was ordained a priest, joined the order of the Jesuits and served as a member of the order in India, Rome, and in Syria, where he acquired a colloquial command of Arabic.

He convinced his superiors to support a mission to the interior of Arabia, which at that time was terra incognita to the rest of the world. He also gained the support of the French emperor, Napoleon III, representing to him that better knowledge of Arabia would benefit French imperialistic schemes in Africa and the Middle East.

Syria and Middle Eastern travels
Palgrave then returned to Syria, where he assumed the identity of a travelling Syrian physician. Stocking his bags with medicines and small trade goods, and accompanied by one servant, he set off for Najd, in north-central Arabia. He traveled as a Muslim. The service he would do for the Society of Jesus and the French empire would be as a spy, not a missionary.

Palgrave became friendly with Faisal bin Turki bin Abdullah Al Saud while in Najd. Faisal's son and heir apparent, Abdullah bin Faisal, asked Palgrave to get him strychnine. Palgrave believed that Abdullah wanted it to poison his father. Palgrave was accused of espionage and was almost executed for his Christian beliefs.

Later life and death
After travelling for a year from Syria, through Najd, and on to Bahrain and Oman, he returned to Europe, where he wrote a narrative of his travels. This narrative became a bestseller and has been reprinted many times. It makes no mention of the covert motives for his journey.

After writing this book, Palgrave made yet another volte-face and renounced his vocation as a Jesuit priest in 1865. He then entered the British Foreign Office and was appointed consul at Sukhum-Kale (Sukhumi) in 1866, and moved to Trebizond (Trabzon) in 1867. In 1868 he married Katherine, the daughter of George Edward Simpson, of Norwich, by whom he had three sons. He was appointed consul at St. Thomas and St. Croix in 1873, Manila in 1876, and in 1878 in Bulgaria, where he was appointed Consul-General. In 1879 he was moved to Bangkok. In 1884 he was appointed Minister Resident and Consul-General to Uruguay, where he served until his death in 1888.

Besides his work on Central Arabia, Gifford Palgrave published a volume of Essays on Eastern Questions, a narrative called Hermann Agha, a sketch of Dutch Guiana, and a volume of essays titled  Ulysses.

References

Footnotes

Sources
 Freeth, Zahra, & H.V.F. Winstone -- Explorers of Arabia from the Renaissance to the End of the Victorian Era, Allen & Unwin, London, 1978
 Palgrave, W. G.:
Personal Narrative of a Year's Journey through Central and Eastern Arabia (1862-1863), vol. I, Macmillan & Co., London, 1865 (full text available online, also reprinted many times)
Personal Narrative of a Year's Journey through Central and Eastern Arabia (1862-1863), vol. II, Macmillan & Co., London, 1866 (full text available online, also reprinted many times)
 The Athenaeum, (No. 3181, October 13, 1888, pp. 483–84).

External links
 
Travels in Arabia from 1892, featuring William Gifford Palgrave
The Penetration of Arabia: A Record of the Development of Western Knowledge Concerning the Arabian Peninsula from 1904 also features Palgrave

1826 births
1888 deaths
People from Westminster
People educated at Charterhouse School
Alumni of Trinity College, Oxford
19th-century English Jesuits
English orientalists
Explorers of Asia
Explorers of Arabia
English explorers
English people of Jewish descent
English travel writers
British diplomats